Clopidol is an organic compound that is used as in veterinary medicine as a coccidiostat.  It is prepared industrially by a multistep process from dehydroacetic acid.

The US National Institute for Occupational Safety and Health has set a recommended exposure limit (REL) for clopidol at 10 mg/m3 TWA (time-weighted average) for total exposure, 5 mg/m3 TWA for respiratory exposure, and 20 mg/m3 for short-term exposure. The Occupational Safety and Health Administration has set a permissible exposure limit (PEL); the respiratory PEL is the same as the REL, but the total exposure limit is 15 mg/m3.

References

Antiparasitic agents
Pyridines
Chloroarenes
Phenols